Sam Little (born 31 August 1975) is an English professional golfer and sports agent. He won five times on the Challenge Tour.

Early and personal life
Little was born in London, England, and is Jewish and has been a member of Hendon Reform Synagogue.

Career
Little turned professional in 1997, and joined the Challenge Tour in 1999, where he recorded his first win in 2001. In 2004 he won for the second time at that level, and graduated to the European Tour at the end of the season via qualifying school. He became renowned for last-gasp performances to maintain his Tour playing rights, ending narrowly inside the top 115 qualifiers in 2005, 2008 and 2009, and finishing runner-up in the final tournament of 2007 to move up to 76th in the Order of Merit from outside the top 170. This remains his best season-end finish.

After the 2010 season Little lost his playing rights on the European Tour, having finished 182nd, and returned to the Challenge Tour.

In 2011, Little won three events from mid-September to mid-October, the M2M Russian Challenge Cup, the Allianz Golf Open Grand Toulouse, and the Roma Golf Open, to regain his European Tour card for the remainder of 2011 and 2012.

Little served on the Maccabi GB Golf Management Team for the 2013 Maccabiah Games. 

In 2014 he became a sports agent.

Family
Little has a wife, Maria, and four children including twin girls. His brother Jamie is also a professional golfer who has played on the European Tour and Challenge Tour.

Professional wins (5)

Challenge Tour wins (5)

Challenge Tour playoff record (1–0)

Results in major championships

Note: Little only played in The Open Championship.
CUT = missed the half-way cut

See also
2006 European Tour Qualifying School graduates
2011 Challenge Tour graduates
2012 European Tour Qualifying School graduates
List of golfers with most Challenge Tour wins
List of golfers to achieve a three-win promotion from the Challenge Tour

References

External links

English male golfers
European Tour golfers
Jewish golfers
Jewish British sportspeople
British sports agents
Golfers from London
People from Rickmansworth
1975 births
Living people